Clive White (born 1928) is a former Australian international lawn bowler.

He won a silver medal in the singles at the 1974 British Commonwealth Games in Christchurch.

He was the 1972 Australian champion winning the singles at the Australian National Bowls Championships.

References

1928 births
Living people
Australian male bowls players
Commonwealth Games medallists in lawn bowls
Commonwealth Games silver medallists for Australia
Bowls players at the 1974 British Commonwealth Games
20th-century Australian people
Medallists at the 1974 British Commonwealth Games